Henri Junior Ndong Ngaleu (born 23 August 1992) is Gabonese professional footballer who plays for Al-Hejaz.

Career

Club
In July 2012, Ndong signed a two-year contract with French Ligue 2 side Auxerre, along with fellow former US Bitam player Rémy Ebanega.

On 25 February 2017, Ndong joined Lithuanian A Lyga side Sūduva Marijampolė. He left team in summer of same year.

In August 2017, Ndong signed for FC Samtredia in the Erovnuli Liga.

International
Ndong played for Gabon national football team at 2012 Africa Cup of Nations. He plays in the centre-back position.

Career statistics

International goals
Scores and results list Gabon's goal tally first.

References

External links
 
 

1992 births
Living people
Gabonese footballers
AS Stade Mandji players
US Bitam players
AJ Auxerre players
FK Sūduva Marijampolė players
A Lyga players
FC Samtredia players
Erovnuli Liga players
FC Shirak players
Al-Ahly SC (Benghazi) players
Al-Hejaz Club players
Armenian Premier League players
Saudi Second Division players
Gabonese expatriate footballers
Expatriate footballers in France
Gabonese expatriate sportspeople in France
Expatriate footballers in Lithuania
Gabonese expatriate sportspeople in Lithuania
Expatriate footballers in Georgia (country)
Gabonese expatriate sportspeople in Georgia (country)
Expatriate footballers in Libya
Gabonese expatriate sportspeople in Libya
Expatriate footballers in Saudi Arabia
Gabonese expatriate sportspeople in Saudi Arabia
Gabon international footballers
2012 Africa Cup of Nations players
Olympic footballers of Gabon
Footballers at the 2012 Summer Olympics
Association football defenders
People from Woleu-Ntem Province
2015 Africa Cup of Nations players
Libyan Premier League players
21st-century Gabonese people
Gabon A' international footballers
2011 African Nations Championship players